Janice M. Fisher is an American politician and a Democratic former member of the Utah House of Representatives represented District 30 January 1, 2013 to December 31, 2014. Fisher was consecutively a member from her appointment by Utah Governor Olene S. Walker to fill the vacancy caused by the appointment of Representative Brent H. Goodfellow to the Utah State Senate, from April 19, 2005 until 31 December 2012, in the District 29 seat. Fisher did not run for District 30 in 2014 and retired December 31, 2014.

Early life and career
Born November 28, Fisher attended LDS Business College and was a homemaker. She currently lives in West Valley City, Utah with her husband Barry.

Political career
2012 
Redistrict to District 30, and with appointed Democratic Representative Brian Doughty redistricted to District 26, Fisher was unopposed for the June 26, 2012 Democratic Primary and won the November 6, 2012 General election with 5,385 votes (51.7%) against Republican nominee incumbent Representative Fred Cox.

2010 
Fisher was unopposed for the June 22, 2010 Democratic Primary and won the November 2, 2010 General election with 2,954 votes (55.7%) against Republican nominee Shirene Saddler.

2008 
Fisher was unopposed for the June 24, 2008 Democratic Primary and won the three-way November 4, 2008 General election with 4,275 votes (60.1%) against returning 2006 Republican opponent Phillip Condor and Constitution candidate Grant Pearson, who had run for Utah State Senate in 2006.

2006 
Fisher was unopposed for the 2006 Democratic Primary and won the four-way November 7, 2006 General election with 2,272 votes (47%) against Republican nominee Phillip Condor, Constitution candidate Susan Sorenson, and Personal Choice Party candidate Annaliese Hinkel; Condor and Sorenson had both run for the seat in 2004.

During the 2014 General Session Fisher served on the House Government Operations Committee and the House Transportation Committee. On March 13, 2014 Fisher announced that she would retire December 31, 2014.

2014 Sponsored Legislation

References

External links
Official page at the Utah State Legislature

Janice Fisher at Ballotpedia
Janice Fisher at the National Institute on Money in State Politics

Place of birth missing (living people)
Year of birth missing (living people)
Living people
Ensign College alumni
Democratic Party members of the Utah House of Representatives
People from West Valley City, Utah
Women state legislators in Utah
21st-century American politicians
21st-century American women politicians